"Right Hand Man" is a song written by Gary Scruggs, and recorded by American country music artist Eddy Raven.  It was released in November 1986 as the second single and title track from the album Right Hand Man.  The song reached #3 on the Billboard Hot Country Singles & Tracks chart.

Charts

Weekly charts

Year-end charts

References

1987 singles
1986 songs
Eddy Raven songs
RCA Records singles